A contingency operation is a military operation involving United States Armed Forces, conducted in response to natural disasters, terrorists, subversives, or as otherwise directed by appropriate authority to protect national interests. The designation is made by a finding by the discretion of the Secretary of Defense, and triggers the implementation of a variety of "wartime" plans and preparations throughout the federal government, and each of the military branches. Contingency operations are often referred to more specifically as overseas contingency operations (OCO), a term which is often substituted because there has not been a recent war on United States soil. The term's best known use is in the United States Congress' Overseas Contingency Operations funding, a discretionary budget appropriation and oft-described slush fund used originally for the wars in Iraq and Afghanistan, but now used more broadly for other expenditures associated primarily with the War on Terror.

The Overseas Contingency Operations budget appropriation was $58.8 billion in 2016, $90 billion in 2017, $69 billion in 2018 and $71.5 billion in 2019. A U.S. House of Representatives panel issued a report in 2020 recommending that overseas contingency operations funding cease after the fiscal year.

Legal definition 
Per 10 USC 101 (a)(13), the term “contingency operation” means a military operation that—

(A) is designated by the Secretary of Defense as an operation in which members of the armed forces are or may become involved in

 military actions, 
 operations, or 
 hostilities against an enemy of the United States or 
 against an opposing military force; or

(B) results in the call or order to, or retention on, active duty of members of the uniformed services under section 688, 12301(a), 12302, 12304, 12304a, 12305, or 12406 of this title, chapter 13 of this title, section 3713 of title 14, or any other provision of law during a war or during a national emergency declared by the President or Congress.

References 

United States military law